Snåsningen is a local print newspaper published in Snåsa, Norway. Published in tabloid format, the newspaper had a circulation of 1,603 in 2013. The newspaper is owned by Trønder-Avisa. It has one weekly issue, on Wednesday. The newspaper was founded in 1995.

References

Newspapers published in Norway
Snåsa
Mass media in Trøndelag
Publications established in 1995
1995 establishments in Norway
Companies based in Trøndelag